John Alan Torbett (born May 21, 1956) is a Republican member of the North Carolina House of Representatives. He has represented the 108th district (including constituents in Gaston County) since 2011.

Political career
Torbett served on the Gaston County Board of Commissioners from 2002 to 2010. He was first elected to the NC House in 2010. He has been re-elected to the seat which covers northeastern Gaston County a total of 5 times, most recently in 2020. On March 3, 2017, Torbett filed a bill H249 entitled Economic Terrorism which would make the civil protest method of Boycott a felony and entitle the target to recover $50,000 or triple damages, whichever is greater.

Corruption in office
In October 2020, Torbett was accused of embezzling money from North Carolina taxpayers by improperly "double-dipping" reimbursements. Investigators documented over $85,000 in housing and travel expenses that Torbett had improperly embezzled since 2017. The scheme involved charging the state for housing and travel expenses while also reimbursing himself from campaign funds, such that Torbett personally profited from every expense.

Electoral history

2020

2018

2016

2014

2012

2010

Committee assignments

2021-2022 session
Appropriations (Vice Chair)
Appropriations - Education (Chair)
Education - K-12 (Chair)
State Government (Chair)
Redistricting (Vice Chair)
Rules, Calendar, and Operations of the House (Vice Chair)
UNC BOG Nominations

2019-2020 session
Appropriations (Vice Chair)
Appropriations - Transportation (Chair)
Homelessness, Foster Care, and Dependency (Chair)
Rules, Calendar, and Operations of the House Committee (Vice Chair)
Transportation (Senior Chair)
Redistricting (Vice Chair)
Judiciary

2017-2018 session
Appropriations (Vice Chair)
Appropriations - Transportation (Chair)
Appropriations - Information Technology
Transportation (Chair)
Rules, Calendar, and Operations of the House (Vice Chair)
Judiciary IV
Commerce and Job Development

2015-2016 session
Appropriations (Vice Chair)
Appropriations - Transportation (Chair)
Appropriations - Information Technology
Transportation (Chair)
Rules, Calendar, and Operations of the House (Vice Chair)
Judiciary IV
Commerce and Job Development
Elections

2013-2014 session
Appropriations (Vice Chair)
Commerce and Job Development (Vice Chair)
Transportation
Rules, Calendar, and Operations of the House
Education
Homeland Security, Military, and Veterans Affairs

2011-2012 session
Appropriations
Homeland Security, Military, and Veterans Affairs (Vice Chair)
Commerce and Job Development
Education
Agriculture

References

External links

Living people
1956 births
People from Chattanooga, Tennessee
People from Gaston County, North Carolina
21st-century American politicians
County commissioners in North Carolina
Republican Party members of the North Carolina House of Representatives